Uganda joined the World Bank on September 27, 1963, along with the IBRD, IDA and IFC. It later joined the ICSID on October 14, 1966, and the MIGA on June 10, 1992. Uganda also holds the chair for the 22 nation Africa Group 1 Constituency, headed by Anne Kabagambe. Uganda holds 0.07%  of the vote in the IBRD while its constituency holds 1.92%. In the IFC, Uganda holds 0.05% of the vote while its constituency holds 1.31%. Uganda in the IDA holds 0.18% of the vote, while the Africa Group 1 Constituency commands 4%. In the MIGA, meanwhile, Uganda has 0.21% while its constituency holds 3.54% of the vote.

Uganda’s economy has recently experienced a slight rebound after a five year slow down, giving rise to a feeling of optimism. However, economic growth remains heavily intertwined with agriculture and natural events, as well as favorable trade conditions going forward. Regional instability among Uganda’s top trading partners combined with a 1.2 million refugee population has also placed strains on Uganda’s economy. Additionally, despite passing its Millennium Development Goal of halving poverty, preventing those who have escaped poverty from sliding back in has proven difficult. The main World Bank projects are involved in infrastructure and education in order reduce poverty in the country, with eleven projects currently underway.

Development Emphasis - Infrastructure and Education 
World Bank initiatives have been focused on reducing poverty through infrastructure development and education. This has included road development, internet accessibility, water management, and nutrition and business education. Education in particular is important, since the average years of education for a Ugandan at age 18 are 7 years, yet regionally it is 8.1. Furthermore, the actual amount learned during these years is questionable and is reduced to 4.5 years of “actual” learning. The Ugandan budget for education is also much lower than others in its region at only 2.6% of GDP.

Infrastructure Development 
Infrastructure development is a major part of World Bank aid to Uganda and generally involve urbanizing and transportation objectives. One such project is the Uganda Support for Municipal Development Project (USMID), which is a USD$150 million IDA led project that began in 2013 with potential plans to expand since 2018. The project was conceived in order to facilitate urban infrastructure development by lending money for the development of fourteen municipalities, where each of these municipalities has considerable autonomy in choosing what kinds of infrastructure programs best suit them. The project is also part of Programs-for-Results, which seeks to deliver aid based on improvement results. On April 19, 2018, the IDA proposed increasing the amount by an additional USD$335 million with the intention of increasing the geographical range of the program to eight more municipalities while increasing the depth of the program in existing ones. It is also designed to help alleviate problems associated with refugee influxes and rapid urbanization in Uganda.

Other examples of large infrastructure development projects include the North Eastern Road-Corridor Asset Management Project (NERAMP), which is designed to increase the efficiency, oversight and quality of road building in the north. There is also the Water Development program which is supposed to help integrate water planning and sanitation services.

Education Development 
Education in Uganda remains a pressing concern for development goals. Education is currently characterized by teacher and student absenteeism, lack of resources, as well as low government spending. According to the UN, Uganda is also home to the third largest refugee population in the world, adding additional stress to its economy and increasing demand for education. Several World Bank projects are designed to help with this, including the Uganda Multi-Sectoral Food Security and Nutrition Project and the Uganda Skills Development Project. The Uganda Multi-Sectoral Food Security and Nutrition Project seeks to educate people about micro-nutrient rich eating and gardening techniques, as well as holding various workshops demonstrating healthy food habits. Meanwhile, the Uganda Skills Development Project is a multi-objective program designed broadly to improve worker skills, fill the needs of the economy, and provide regulation for other training services.

Active World Bank Projects in Uganda

References 

Economy of Uganda
World Bank Group relations